Ridgefield High School (RHS) is a public high school in Ridgefield, Washington in Clark County. RHS is the only public high school in the Ridgefield School District. As of 2012, the school reported 728 students. RHS is a member of the Washington Interscholastic Activities Association Southwest District.

History
Originally, Horn's Corner School merged into becoming Ridgefield High School, on November 12, 1911. By May 1912, the first class had graduated. 50 students were enrolled by September, making it the second largest school in Clark County at the time. An eight-room $15,000 school house was formally opened for both grade and high school students in January, 1922.

On May 10, 1927, the school burned down. It was replaced by a brick and tile school in February 1928 for $85,000. That school stood until Union Ridge (a current elementary school) was used to house the high schoolers in double shifts with the elementary students for new construction during 1969-1970. By June 1971, the old high school was demolished and used for space to park buses. Phase 1 consisted of one building and a gym.

Sports

Football
The 1995 season the Ridgefield Spudders won the WIAA State 1A Championship. against Cascade (Leavenworth) 44–30 in the Tacoma Dome in Tacoma Washington. Fullback Nate Edgar rush for four touchdowns in the game and is still an Individual championship game 1A record. In the game Ridgefield tied the championship game 1A record for most first downs in a game 23. The combine score 74 total points was a championship game 1A record tell 2010.[8] Ridgefield was the first school from Clark County Washington to win the State football Championship.

Volleyball
The Ridgefield Spudders from 1975 to 1993 had 18 consecutive WIAA 1A State Playoffs appearances, placing 14 times (4 State Champions 1975, 1976, 1983 and 1990. Runner-up 1977, 1980 and 1981. 3rd Place 1983 and 1987. Fourth Place 1979, 1982, 1989, 1992, 1993).  In 2015, Spudder Volleyball placed 3rd in 2A State Playoffs.  According to the WIAA, in their most recently published annual State Championship Volleyball publication (2015, see "All Time Information"), the RHS Volleyball program has made more WIAA State appearances than any other school regardless of its size, tallying a total of 34 appearances at State since 1975.

Cross Country
In 1995 the boys cross country had their best team finish in the WIAA 1A State Championship finishing 6th place with the team score of 164 Ridgefield Spudder Jim Reed won the race with the time of 15:11.5 (3.0 miles).

Girls Cross Country 
In 1994 the girls cross country had their best team finish in the WIAA Girls 1A State Championship finishing 3rd with the team score of 115.

Basketball
In 1981 Ridgefield place 3rd in the WIAA 1A State Basketball Tournament defeating Goldendale 84–63 at Univ. of Puget Sound.

Girls Basketball
In 1978 Ridgefield place 4th in the WIAA 1A State Girls Basketball Tournament defeating Liberty Bell 52–51 at Central WA Univ.

Wrestling
Had their best finish as State Runners-up  1968-69,1969–70

Baseball
The 2002 season the Ridgefield Spudders won the WIAA State 2A Championship against Ephrata 15–10 in Yakima WA.

Softball
The 2004 season the Ridgefield Spudders won the WIAA State 2A Fastpitch Softball Championship against East Valley (Yakima) in Wenatchee, WA 6-3.

Boys Soccer
In 2004 and 2005, the Spudders lost in the 2A state finals to Wahluke, both games 1-0. In 2012 and 2013, the Ridgefield Spudders took 4th in the state soccer tournament.

Girls Soccer
Had made it to the 2nd round of the WIAA State Playoffs 7 times with 11 appearances. In 2015, the Lady Spuds took home 2nd place, losing 4-0 against Squalicum.

Tennis
In 2006 the Girls tennis team had their best finish as State Runner-up in WIAA 2A Championship. against Ephrata 25-16. In 2003 the boys tennis team had their best finish as State Runner-Up in the WIAA 2A Championship.

Golf
In 2019 the Boys Golf Team won the WIAA 2A State Championship beating runner up Sequim 128 to 83.5.  In 2004 & 2011 The Boys Golf team had finished as State Runner-up in WIAA Championship.

Track And Field 
In 1997 the boys track and field team won the WIAA 1A State championship against runner-up Quincy 50–40.

Notable alumni
 Matt Randel -  professional baseball pitcher

References

External links 
 
Ridgefield Washington School District - Official school district website

High schools in Clark County, Washington
Public high schools in Washington (state)